假扮的天使 (py. Jiǎbàn de Tiānshǐ, English; "Pretend Angel") is an album by Taiwanese singer Vivian Hsu, released September 19, 2000 on the BMG label. This is Vivian's first album that prominently features hard rock songs. Track 10 is a children's sing-along with Vivian, which she recorded while shooting the film The Accidental Spy, part of which was shot in Turkey (hence the title of track 5).

Track listing
"序曲"～失踪的壁虎 (py. Xù Qě – Shī de Bìhǔ) – 0:44
"假扮的天使" (py. Jiǎbàn de Tiānshǐ, en. Pretend Angel) – 4:26
"她他" (py. Tā Tā) – 4:35
"半調子" (py. Bàn Diàozǐ) – 5:11
"Walking in Turkey" – 4:37
"老夫婦" (py. Lǎo Fū Fù) – 5:05
"快過期的草莓" (py. Kuài Guòqī de Cǎoméi) – 4:21
"人不為己 天誅地滅" (py. Rén Bù Wèi Jǐ Tiān Zhū Dì Miè) – 3:17
"魔鬼愛奢侈的眼淚" (py. Móguǐ Ài Shēchǐ Yǎnlèi) – 3:45
"I Love U" – 3:16

Vivian Hsu albums
2000 albums
Mandarin-language albums